Maurice Karnaugh (October 4, 1924 – November 8, 2022) was an American physicist, mathematician, computer scientist, and inventor known for the Karnaugh map used in Boolean algebra.

Career
Karnaugh studied mathematics and physics at City College of New York (1944 to 1948) and transferred to Yale University to complete his B.Sc. (1949), M.Sc. (1950) and Ph.D. in physics with a thesis on The Theory of Magnetic Resonance and Lambda-Type Doubling in Nitric-Oxide (1952).

Karnaugh worked at Bell Labs (1952 to 1966), developing the Karnaugh map (1954) as well as patents for PCM encoding and magnetic logic circuits and coding. He later worked at IBM's Federal Systems Division in Gaithersburg (1966 to 1970) and at the IBM Thomas J. Watson Research Center (1970 to 1994), studying multistage interconnection networks.

Karnaugh was elected an IEEE Fellow in 1976, and held an adjunct position at Polytechnic University of New York (now New York University Tandon School of Engineering) at the Westchester campus from 1980 to 1999.

Personal life and death
Karnaugh was married to the former Linn Blank Weil from 1970 until his death in 2022.  He had two grown sons, Robert Victor Karnaugh and Paul Joseph Karnaugh, from his first marriage.

Karnaugh died in The Bronx on November 8, 2022, at the age of 98.

Publications
 
 
 
 
  (61 pages)

See also
 List of pioneers in computer science

References

External links
 Publications at DBLP

1924 births
2022 deaths
21st-century American physicists
American telecommunications engineers
Scientists at Bell Labs
Fellow Members of the IEEE
Yale University alumni
IBM employees
Polytechnic Institute of New York University faculty
Scientists from New York City